Gressan (Valdôtain:  or ) is a town and comune in the Aosta Valley region of north-western Italy. Its patron saint is Saint Stephen.

Notable people 

 Maturino Blanchet, (1892-1974), bishop of Aosta